The 1957–58 FA Cup  was the 77th staging of the world's oldest football cup competition, the Football Association Challenge Cup, commonly known as the FA Cup. Bolton Wanderers won the competition for the fourth time, beating Manchester United 2–0 in the final at Wembley. The competition is notable for the exploits of Manchester United following the loss of much of their team in the Munich air disaster on 6 February 1958. They came through three rounds following the accident, before being beaten by Bolton in the final.

Matches were scheduled to be played at the stadium of the team named first on the date specified for each round, which was always a Saturday. Some matches, however, might be rescheduled for other days if there were clashes with games for other competitions or the weather was inclement. If scores were level after 90 minutes had been played, a replay would take place at the stadium of the second-named team later the same week. If the replayed match was drawn further replays would be held until a winner was determined. If scores were level after 90 minutes had been played in a replay, a 30-minute period of extra time would be played.

Calendar

First round proper

At this stage all the clubs from the Football League Third Division North and South joined 30 non-league clubs having come through the qualifying rounds. To complete this round, Bishop Auckland and Wycombe Wanderers given byes.  Matches were scheduled to be played on Saturday, 16 November 1957. Five were drawn and went to replays, with one of these going to a second replay.

Second round proper
The matches were scheduled for Saturday, 7 December 1957. Seven matches were drawn, with replays taking place later the same week.

Third round proper
The 44 First and Second Division clubs entered the competition at this stage. The matches were scheduled for Saturday, 4 January 1958, although the York City–Birmingham City match was postponed until the following midweek fixture. Six matches were drawn and went to replays, with one of these requiring a second replay.

Fourth round proper
The matches were scheduled for Saturday, 25 January 1958, with two matches taking place on later dates. Five matches were drawn and went to replays, which were all played in the following midweek match.

Fifth round proper
The matches were scheduled for Saturday, 15 February 1958. Two matches went to replays in the following mid-week fixture. This round is notable as containing Manchester United's first game following the Munich Air Disaster, which was postponed by four days due to the incident, with United struggling to put a team together to play. In a highly emotional game for both the players and the fans, United beat Sheffield Wednesday 3–0 to go through to the next round.

Sixth round proper
The four quarter-final ties were scheduled to be played on Saturday, 1 March 1958. The West Bromwich Albion–Manchester United game went to a replay before United went through.

Semi-finals
The semi-final matches were played on Saturday, 22 March 1958, with the Manchester United–Fulham match replaying on the 26th. Bolton Wanderers and Manchester United won their ties to meet in the final at Wembley.

Replay

Final

The FA Cup final took place on 3 May 1958 at Wembley Stadium and was won by Bolton Wanderers, beating Manchester United 2–0. United had been decimated following the Munich Air Disaster, but still managed to come through three rounds of the cup following the incident before meeting Bolton in the final.

References
General
The FA Cup Archive at TheFA.com
F.A. Cup results 1957/58 at Footballsite
Specific

 
FA Cup seasons